Kirill Vladimirovich Pletnyov (born December 30, 1979, Kharkiv, USSR) is a Russian theater and film actor, film director, screenwriter, producer. Winner of the Sochi Open Russian Film Festival (2015) and Golden Eagle Award (2017).

Selected filmography
Actor
 Deadly Force (2000) as Dmitry (2nd season)
 Bear's Kiss (2002) as Nick
 Children of the Arbat (2004) as Fyodor
 Russian Translation (2006) as investigator Kondrashov
 Nine Lives of Nestor Makhno (2005) as Vladislav Danilevsky
 The Admiral (2008) as midshipman Frolov
 High Security Vacation (2009) as Gennady Vasilkov
 The Priest (2009) as Aleksandr Lugotintsev
 August Eighth (2012) as tank driver
 Friday (2016) as Maxim
 Yolki 5 (2016) as Kostya
 Collector (2016)   as Yevgeny (voice)
 The Perfect Ones (2018)   as Vanya
Director
 Light Up! (2017)
 The Perfect Ones (2018)
  (2018)

References

External links 
 

1979 births
Living people
Actors from Kharkiv
Russian male film actors
Russian male stage actors
Russian male television actors
21st-century Russian male actors
Russian film directors
Russian State Institute of Performing Arts alumni
Russian screenwriters
Male screenwriters
Film people from Kharkiv